Abu Bakr al-Hassan ibn al-Khasib, also al-Khaseb, Albubather in Latin, was a Persian physician and astrologer of the 9th century.

He wrote in Persian and Arabic and is best known for his work De nativitatibus which was translated into Latin by Canonicus Salio in Padua 1218, and was also translated into Hebrew; the book had many reprints till 1540.

Works

See also
List of Iranian scientists

References

Sources
 Al-fihrist by Ibn al-Nadim, p. 276 and Commentary, p. 131.
 H. Suter : Die Mathematiker und Astronomen der Araber (32, 1900)
 Nachtrage (162, 1902)
 Encyclopedia of Islam, II, 274, 1916.

Year of birth unknown
9th-century deaths
9th-century Iranian physicians
Medieval Iranian astrologers
Physicians from the Abbasid Caliphate